Sawzall is a procedural domain-specific programming language, used by Google to process large numbers of individual log records. Sawzall was first described in 2003, and the szl runtime was open-sourced in August 2010. However, since the MapReduce table aggregators have not been released, the open-sourced runtime is not useful for large-scale data analysis of multiple log files off the shelf. Sawzall has been replaced by Lingo (logs in Go) for most purposes within Google.

Motivation
Google's server logs are stored as large collections of records (Protocol Buffers) that are partitioned over many disks within GFS. In order to perform calculations involving the logs, engineers can write MapReduce programs in C++ or Java. MapReduce programs need to be compiled and may be more verbose than necessary, so writing a program to analyze the logs can be time-consuming. To make it easier to write quick scripts, Rob Pike et al. developed the Sawzall language. A Sawzall script runs within the Map phase of a MapReduce and "emits" values to tables. Then the Reduce phase (which the script writer does not have to be concerned about) aggregates the tables from multiple runs into a single set of tables.

Currently, only the language runtime (which runs a Sawzall script once over a single input) has been open-sourced; the supporting program built on MapReduce has not been released.

Features
Some interesting features include:
 A Sawzall script has a single input (a log record) and can output only by emitting to tables. The script can have no other side-effects.
 A script can define any number of output tables. Table types include:
 collection saves every value emitted
 sum saves the sum of every emitted value
 maximum(n) saves only the highest n values on a given weight.
In addition, there are several statistical table types that give inexact results. The higher the parameter n, the more accurate the estimates are.
 sample(n) gives a random sample of n values from all the emitted values
 quantile(n) calculates a cumulative probability distribution of the given numbers.
 top(n) gives n values that are probably the most frequent of the emitted values.
 unique(n) estimates the number of unique values emitted.

Sawzall's design favors efficiency and engine simplicity over power:
 Sawzall is statically typed, and the engine compiles the script to x86 before running it.
 Sawzall supports the compound data types lists, maps, and structs. However, there are no references or pointers. All assignments and function arguments create copies. This means that recursive data structures and cycles are impossible.
 Like C, functions can modify global variables and local variables but are not closures.

Sawzall code
This complete Sawzall program will read the input and produce three results: the number of records, the sum of the values,
and the sum of the squares of the values.

 count: table sum of int;
 total: table sum of float;
 sum_of_squares: table sum of float;
 x: float = input;
 emit count <- 1;
 emit total <- x;
 emit sum_of_squares <- x * x;

See also 
 Pig – similar tool and language for use with Apache Hadoop
 Sawmill (software)

References

Further reading 
 S. Ghemawat, H. Gobioff, S.-T. Leung, The Google file system, in: 19th ACM Symposium on Operating Systems Principles, Proceedings, 17 ACM Press, 2003, pp. 29–43.

External links 
 Google Code Archive - Long-term storage for Google Code Project Hosting.
 MapReduce

Domain-specific programming languages
Procedural programming languages
Google software
Programming languages created in 2003
Software using the Apache license